Richard Serle (fl. 1304–1307) was an English politician. He was a Member of the Parliament of England for New Shoreham in 1304–05 and 1307.

References

13th-century births
14th-century deaths
English MPs 1305
English MPs 1307